UFC on ESPN: Woodley vs. Burns (also known as UFC on ESPN 9 and UFC Vegas) was a mixed martial arts event produced by the Ultimate Fighting Championship that took place on May 30, 2020 at the UFC Apex facility in Enterprise, Nevada, part of the Las Vegas Metropolitan Area, United States.

Background
Amid the COVID-19 pandemic, this event was originally expected to be held on May 23, but eventually was pushed back to May 30 at a yet TBD location. UFC president Dana White stated that he intended for the event to take place in Las Vegas. However, if the Nevada state government did not allow the fight to happen due to restrictions put in place in response to the COVID-19 pandemic, he would look to have the event take place in Arizona instead, since professional sports were allowed to return on May 15 without fans in attendance. White confirmed on May 20 that the event would be held at the UFC Apex facility in Las Vegas, despite no official announcement from the Nevada State Athletic Commission (NSAC) regarding permission for combat sports. The NSAC approved the return of mixed martial arts events to the state on May 27.

A welterweight bout between former UFC Welterweight Champion Tyron Woodley and Gilbert Burns was long rumored to serve as the event headliner. On May 22, Dana White confirmed the main event and entire card to be broadcast on ESPN.

Additionally, the event included fighters that were pulled from other events previously cancelled, as well as the following bouts:

A heavyweight bout between former WSOF Heavyweight Champion Blagoy Ivanov and Augusto Sakai (scheduled for the original May 9 date of UFC 250 that later became UFC 249).
A women's strawweight bout between Mackenzie Dern and Hannah Cifers (scheduled for UFC Fight Night: Smith vs. Teixeira on April 25).

On May 26, Kevin Holland was forced to withdraw from his scheduled welterweight bout with Daniel Rodriguez due to injury. He was replaced by promotional newcomer Gabriel Green.

At the weigh-ins, Brok Weaver weighed in at 157.5 pounds, one and a half pounds over the lightweight non-title fight limit of 156 pounds. He was fined 20% of his purse, which went to his opponent Roosevelt Roberts and their bout proceeded at a catchweight.

Results

Bonus awards
The following fighters received $50,000 bonuses.
Fight of the Night: Brandon Royval vs. Tim Elliott
Performance of the Night: Gilbert Burns and Mackenzie Dern

Reported payout
The following is the reported payout to the fighters as reported to the NSAC. It does not include sponsor money and also does not include the UFC's traditional "fight night" bonuses. The total disclosed payout for the event was $1,157,000.
 Gilbert Burns: $164,000 (includes $84,000 win bonus) def. Tyron Woodley: $200,000
 Augusto Sakai: $100,000 (includes $50,000 win bonus) def. Blagoy Ivanov $60,000
 Billy Quarantillo: $24,000 (includes $12,000 win bonus) def. Spike Carlyle: $12,000
 Roosevelt Roberts: $46,400 (includes $22,000 win bonus) def. Brok Weaver: $9,600 ^
 Mackenzie Dern: $66,000 (includes $33,000 win bonus) def. Hannah Cifers: $25,000
 Katlyn Chookagian: $120,000 (includes $60,000 win bonus) def. Antonina Shevchenko: $35,000
 Daniel Rodriguez: $24,000 (includes $12,000 win bonus) def. Gabriel Green: $12,000
 Jamahal Hill: $24,000 (includes $12,000 win bonus) def. Klidson Abreu: $18,000
 Brandon Royval: $24,000 (includes $12,000 win bonus) def. Tim Elliott: $31,000
 Casey Kenney: $54,000 (includes $27,000 win bonus) def. Louis Smolka: $48,000
 Chris Gutiérrez: $40,000 (includes $20,000 win bonus) def. Vince Morales: $20,000

^ Weaver was fined 20% ($2,400) of his purse for missing weight, which went to Roberts.

Aftermath
On August 5, it was announced that the NSAC issued temporary suspensions for Jamahal Hill and Tim Elliott, after they tested positive for marijuana in their respective pre-fight screenings. On September 3, the NSAC announced that Hill's victory was overturned to a no contest due to the violation. He was suspended six months and fined 15% of his fight purse. Meanwhile, Elliott was suspended four and a half months and fined 15% of his fight purse. The reduced suspension was due to his fight being taken on short notice.

See also 

 List of UFC events
 List of current UFC fighters
 2020 in UFC

References 

UFC on ESPN
2020 in mixed martial arts
2020 in sports in Nevada
Mixed martial arts in Las Vegas
Sports competitions in Las Vegas
May 2020 sports events in the United States